Peter Németh (born 14 September 1972) is a retired Slovak football player and manager.

Németh played for several top Slovak clubs during his career, including Inter Bratislava and MŠK Žilina. He also spent one season playing for Czech team Baník Ostrava. Since 2001 he played mostly in Germany. Németh was also a regular for the Slovakia national football team.

References

External links
 

1972 births
Living people
Slovak footballers
Slovak expatriate footballers
Slovakia international footballers
AS Trenčín players
Czech First League players
FC Baník Ostrava players
MŠK Žilina players
FK Inter Bratislava players
Eintracht Frankfurt players
Sportfreunde Siegen players
Slovak Super Liga players
2. Bundesliga players
Expatriate footballers in Germany
Expatriate footballers in the Czech Republic
Dynamo Dresden non-playing staff
Dynamo Dresden managers
Association football midfielders
3. Liga managers
Slovak people of Hungarian descent
Slovak football managers
Sportspeople from Bojnice
FC Baník Prievidza players